Ivolginsky datsan is the Center of the Buddhist Traditional Sangha of Russia, Buddhist Temple located in Buryatia, Russia, 23 km from Ulan Ude, near Verkhnyaya Ivolga village.

History
The datsan was opened in 1945 as the only Buddhist spiritual centre of the USSR. In the course of time the little "Khambin's sume" changed into the Monastic centre with a residence of Pandido Khambo lama, the leader of all Russian Lamas.

It was the residence of the Central Spiritual Board of Buddhists of the USSR and later of the Buddhist Traditional Sangha of Russia, as well as that of Pandido Khambo lama, the head of the Russian Buddhists. The spiritual activity of the datsan is manifested in temple rites, medical practice, and a traditional system of Buddhist education. The Buddhist university «Dashi Choinkhorling» was opened in 1991 attached to the datsan.

Treasures of culture

Although built in the late 1940s with light-colored brick, the [main] temple displays traditional proportions and ornamentation. The first level is devoted to study and prayer. The second level preserves sacred texts. The third level, the gonkan, serves as an inner sanctum devoted to the guardian deities. The gonkan is surrounded by an open gallery to allow ceremonial processions around the sacred space.

Unique samples of old Buryat art, as thangkas, sculptures, ritual objects are gathered and preserved at the Ivolginsky datsan. Among the monastery's treasures there is a collection of old Buddhist manuscripts written in Tibetan language on natural silk, and a greenhouse with a sacred Bodhi tree.

As a cultural and religious monument, the Datsan is protected by the State. The Datsan Centre consists of such temples as Sockshin-dugan, Maidrin-sume, Devazhin and Sakhiusan-sume. There are also a library, a hotel, the Choyra (Faculty of Philosophy), Dashi Choinhorlin (building of the Buddhist University), Museum of Buryat Art, suburgans (stupas), some infrastructure buildings and lamas' houses.

Within the Datsan complex is the Korean style wooden Etigel Khambin temple which honors the 12th Khambo Lama whose body was recently exhumed.

Itigelov

In 1927, the 12th Pandito Hambo Lama of the Ivolginsky Datsan, Dashi-Dorzho Itigelov, told his students and fellow monks to bury his body after his death and to check on it again in 30 years. According to the story, Itigelov then sat in the lotus position, began chanting the prayer of death, and died, mid-meditation. The monks followed Itigilov's directions, and when they exhumed his body 30 years later, as the story goes, they were amazed to find none of the usual signs of decay and decomposition. Fearful of the Soviet response to the "religious miracle", the monks reburied Itigilov's body in an unmarked grave; packing the wooden coffin with salt.

Itigelov's story was not forgotten; a young lama named Bimba Dorzhiyez turned to a bhuddist whose father-in-law had witnessed the original exhumation. On September 11, 2002, the body was again exhumed, a process witnessed by twelve people, including two forensic scientists and a photographer. The official statement was issued about the body – very well preserved, without major signs of decay, whole muscles and inner tissue, soft joints and skin.

See also

Buddhist monasteries in Russia
Buddhism in the Russian Federation

References

External links
Photograph of Ivolginsk Buddhist Datsan, Main Temple, Interior, Ivolga, Russia
  Site of the Buruatian Ministry of Culture
  Ivolginsky datsan
  Hambo Lama Itigelov
  Hambo Lama Itigelov at the Buddhist Channel
  Official home page of the Ivolginsky datsan

Buddhism in Buryatia
Buddhism in the Soviet Union
Buildings and structures built in the Soviet Union
Buddhist monasteries in Russia
Gelug monasteries
Buildings and structures in Buryatia
Religious organizations established in 1945
Tourist attractions in Buryatia
Buddhist temples in Russia
20th-century Buddhist temples
Cultural heritage monuments in Buryatia
Objects of cultural heritage of Russia of regional significance